Desmoscelis is a genus of flowering plants belonging to the family Melastomataceae.

Its native range is Southern Tropical America.

Species:

Desmoscelis calcarata 
Desmoscelis villosa

References

Melastomataceae
Melastomataceae genera
Taxa named by Charles Victor Naudin
Taxa described in 1850